NGC 47 (also known as NGC 58, MCG -1-1-55, IRAS00119-0726 and PGC 967) is a barred spiral galaxy in the constellation Cetus, discovered in 1886 by Ernst Wilhelm Leberecht Tempel. Its alternate name NGC 58 is due to the observation by Lewis Swift, who was unaware that Tempel had already discovered the celestial object earlier. It appears as a small, faint spiral nebula with a bright core and is slightly oval.

It is approximately 236 Mly (236 million light years) from Earth, measured by way of a generic "redshift estimate".

References

External links 
 
 SEDS: Spiral Galaxy NGC 47
 

Barred spiral galaxies
Cetus (constellation)
0047
00967
18861021
Discoveries by Lewis Swift
Discoveries by Wilhelm Tempel